The Lake Shore and Michigan Southern Railway, established in 1833 and sometimes referred to as the Lake Shore, was a major part of the New York Central Railroad's Water Level Route from Buffalo, New York, to Chicago, Illinois, primarily along the south shore of Lake Erie (in New York, Pennsylvania and Ohio) and across northern Indiana. The line's trackage remains a major rail transportation corridor used by Amtrak passenger trains and several freight lines; in 1998, its ownership was split at Cleveland between CSX Transportation to the east and Norfolk Southern Railway in the west.

History

Early history: 1835–1869

Toledo to Chicago

On April 22, 1833, the Erie and Kalamazoo Railroad was chartered in the Territory of Michigan to run from the former Port Lawrence, Michigan (now Toledo, Ohio), near Lake Erie, northwest to Adrian on the River Raisin. The Toledo War soon gave about one-third of the route to the state of Ohio. Horse-drawn trains began operating on November 2, 1836; the horses were replaced by a newly arrived steam locomotive, Adrian No. 1, in August 1837.

The Buffalo and Mississippi Railroad was chartered in Indiana on February 6, 1835, to run from Buffalo, New York, to the Mississippi River. The name was changed on February 6, 1837, to the Northern Indiana Railroad, which would run from the eastern border of Indiana west to Michigan City on Lake Michigan. Some grading between Michigan City and La Porte was done in 1838, but money ran out.

Around 1838, the state of Michigan started to build the Southern Railroad, running from Monroe on Lake Erie west to New Buffalo on Lake Michigan. The first section, from Monroe west to Petersburg, opened in 1839. Extensions opened in 1840 to Adrian and 1843 to Hillsdale. On May 9, 1846, the partially completed line was sold to the Michigan Southern Rail Road, which changed the planned western terminal to Chicago using the charter of the Northern Indiana Railroad. The grading that had been done was not used, as the grade was too steep, and instead the original Buffalo and Mississippi Railroad charter was used west of La Porte, IN. The Michigan Southern leased the Erie and Kalamazoo on August 1, 1849, giving it a branch to Toledo and a connection to planned railroads to the east.

Due to lobbying by the Michigan Central Railroad, a competitor of the Michigan Southern, the latter's charter prevented it from going within two miles of the Indiana state line east of Constantine. However, the most practical route went closer than two miles west of White Pigeon. To allow for this, Judge Stanfield of South Bend, Indiana, bought the right-of-way from White Pigeon to the state line, and leased it to the railroad company for about 10 years until the charter was modified to allow the company to own it.

The Northern Indiana and Chicago Railroad was chartered on November 30, 1850. Its initial tracks, from the Michigan Southern at the state line running west-southwest to Elkhart, Indiana, then west through Osceola and Mishawaka to South Bend, opened on October 4, 1851. The full line west to Chicago opened on February 20, 1852, (running to the predecessor of Englewood station, together with the Chicago and Rock Island Railroad). A more direct line was soon planned from Elkhart east to Toledo, and the Northern Indiana Railroad was chartered in Ohio on March 3, 1851. On July 8, 1853, the Ohio and Indiana companies merged, and on February 7, 1855, the Northern Indiana and Chicago Railroad and the Buffalo and Mississippi Railroad were merged into the Northern Indiana Railroad. On April 25, 1855, that company in turn merged with the Michigan Southern Rail Road to form the Michigan Southern and Northern Indiana Railroad. In 1858,  the new alignment (Northern Indiana Air Line) from Elkhart east to Air Line Junction in Toledo was completed. The company now owned a main line from Chicago to Toledo, with an alternate route through southern Michigan east of Elkhart, and a branch off that alternate to Monroe, Michigan. Also included was the Detroit, Monroe and Toledo Railroad, leased July 1, 1856, and providing a branch from Toledo past Monroe to Detroit.

Erie to Cleveland
The Franklin Canal Company was chartered on May 21, 1844, and built a railroad from Erie, Pennsylvania, southwest to the Ohio border. The Cleveland, Painesville and Ashtabula Railroad was incorporated February 18, 1848, to build northeast from Cleveland to join the Canal Company's railroad at the state line, and the full line from Erie to Cleveland opened November 20, 1852. The Cleveland, Painesville and Ashtabula bought the Franklin Canal Company on June 20, 1854.

Buffalo to Erie
The Buffalo and State Line Railroad was incorporated October 13, 1849, and opened January 1, 1852, from Dunkirk, New York, west to Pennsylvania. The rest of the line from Dunkirk to Buffalo opened on February 22. The Erie and North East Railroad was chartered April 12, 1842, to build the part from the state line west to Erie, and opened on January 19, 1852. This would result in through passengers no longer having to change trains at Erie, and on December 7, 1853, the Erie Gauge War began between the railroads and the townspeople. On February 1, 1854, the relaying was finished and the first train passed through Erie. On May 15, 1867, the two companies between Buffalo and Erie merged to form the Buffalo and Erie Railroad.

Cleveland to Toledo
The Junction Railroad was chartered March 2, 1846, to build from Cleveland west to Toledo. The Toledo, Norwalk and Cleveland Railroad was chartered March 7, 1850, to build from Toledo east to Grafton on the Cleveland, Columbus and Cincinnati Railroad. The latter company opened on January 24, 1853, finally forming a continuous Buffalo-Chicago line. On September 1 the two companies merged to form the Cleveland and Toledo Railroad, with the Junction Railroad becoming the Northern Division and the Toledo, Norwalk and Cleveland the Southern Division. The Northern Division opened from Cleveland west to Sandusky on October 24, 1853, and the rest of the way to Toledo on April 24, 1855. The Northern Division was abandoned west of Sandusky due to lack of business, but the track was relaid in 1872, merging with the Southern Division at Millbury, east of Toledo. In 1866 the Southern Division east of Oberlin was abandoned and a new line was built to Elyria on the Northern Division, ending the use of the Cleveland, Columbus and Cincinnati Railroad.

Consolidations
In October 1867, the Cleveland, Painesville and Ashtabula Railroad leased the Cleveland and Toledo Railroad. The CP&A changed its name to the Lake Shore Railway on March 31, 1868, and on February 11, 1869, the Lake Shore absorbed the Cleveland and Toledo. On April 6 the Michigan Southern and Northern Indiana Railroad and Lake Shore merged to form the Lake Shore and Michigan Southern Railway, which absorbed the Buffalo and Erie Railroad on June 22, giving one company the whole route from Buffalo to Chicago. The main route passed through Dunkirk; Erie; Ashtabula, Ohio; Cleveland; Toledo; Waterloo, Indiana; and South Bend. An alternate route (the Sandusky Division) in Ohio ran north of the main line between Elyria and Millbury (not all track was laid until 1872). From Toledo to Elkhart, the Old Road ran to the north, through southern Michigan, and the through route was called the Air Line Division or Northern Indiana Air Line. Along with various branches that had been acquired (see below), the Monroe Branch ran east from Adrian, Michigan, to Monroe, where it intersected the leased Detroit, Monroe and Toledo Railroad. At some point the original line to Toledo was abandoned west of the branch to Jackson, Michigan (Palmyra and Jacksonburgh Railroad), with the new connection at Lenawee Junction, the crossing between that branch and the line to Monroe.

Lake Shore and Michigan Southern Railway: 1869–1914

Around 1877, Cornelius Vanderbilt and his New York Central and Hudson River Railroad gained a majority of stock of the Lake Shore and Michigan Southern Railway. The line provided an ideal extension of the New York Central main line from Buffalo west to Chicago, along with the route across southern Ontario (Canada Southern Railway and Michigan Central Railroad). On December 22, 1914, the New York Central and Hudson River Railroad merged with the Lake Shore and Michigan Southern Railway to form a new New York Central Railroad.

While the original main line was to the south of Sandusky Bay between Toledo and Elyria, the northern alignment (the Sandusky Division) eventually became the main line.

New York Central Railroad: 1914–1968
On December 22, 1914, New York Central and Hudson River Railroad merged with the Lake Shore and Michigan Southern Railway to form the New York Central Railroad (NYC) which is the main line running south between Toledo and Elyria, eventually passing by north through the Sandusky Division.

Post-NYC: 1968–present
In 1968, the New York Central merged into Penn Central, which two years later, filed for bankruptcy. In 1976, it became part of Conrail. In 1976, the Southern Division from Elyria to Millbury was abandoned, with parts of the former right of way now in use as a recreational trail, the North Coast Inland Trail.  Under Conrail, the Lake Shore main line was part of the New York City–Chicago Chicago Line.

In 1998, Conrail was split between CSX and Norfolk Southern. The Chicago Line east of Cleveland, Ohio went to CSX, and was split into several subdivisions: the Lake Shore Subdivision from Buffalo, New York to Erie, Pennsylvania, the Erie West Subdivision from Erie to east of Cleveland, Ohio, and the Cleveland Terminal Subdivision into downtown Cleveland. From the former Cleveland and Pittsburgh Railroad junction in Cleveland west to Chicago, the line is now Norfolk Southern's Chicago Line.

Amtrak's New York City–Chicago Lake Shore Limited runs along the full route from Buffalo west. The Capitol Limited joins in Cleveland at the "Amtrak Connection" from the former PRR C&P line, just east of the present Cleveland Station (MP 181), on its way from Washington, D.C., to Chicago. Passenger trains along the route originally terminated at LaSalle Street Station, but now run to Union Station, switching to the parallel former Pittsburgh, Fort Wayne and Chicago Railway (Pennsylvania Railroad) at a crossover in Whiting, Indiana to get there.

Branches

A major branch of the LS&MS extended from Northeastern Ohio to the coal and oil fields of northwestern Pennsylvania terminating near Brookville, PA. Originally the line extended to the oil fields and refineries on the Allegheny River at Franklin and Oil City.

The line was later extended from Polk Junction, West of Franklin, to Rose, just west of Brookville, PA. Also added was a connector South from Franklin to the Allegheny River crossing on the new extension. This line included perhaps the most impressive engineering structures on the LS&MS (as well as the later NYC) with several large trestles, bridges and tunnels near Brookville, including a bridge-tunnel-bridge-tunnel-fill combination near Piney, and two magnificent trestles West of Brookville near Corsica. The New York Central used trackage rights over the Pennsylvania Railroad and B&O to connect from Rose to NYC lines at Clearfield, PA.

There were several mines on this line near Brookville, as well as a connection to the Lake Erie, Franklin and Clarion (LEF&C) at Sutton, and connections to the Pennsylvania Railroad and, via the Pennsy, to the Pittsburgh & Shawmut at Brookville.

Once coal traffic dried up in the late 1990s, this line was severed and cut back to the mine at Piney. Many of the larger trestles were taken out in the late 2000s, reportedly on orders of the Public Utility Commission (PUC), although the bridge across the Clarion River survived, as of 2015.

Station listing

See also

 LeGrand Lockwood, company treasurer
 John E. Gunckel, passenger agent 

Competitors
Michigan Central Railroad
New York, Chicago and St. Louis Railroad (Nickel Plate Road)

Footnotes

References

Corporate History of North American Railroads
History of the Lake Shore and Michigan Southern Railway Company
Excerpts from "History of St. Joseph County, Indiana" (1880)
Lake Shore & Michigan Southern Railway System and Representative Employees Biographical Publishing Company, 1900
J. David Ingles, IC may get new Chicago entrance, Trains June 1999
Mileposts from CSX Transportation Timetables
The Lake Shore and Michigan Southern Railway, Published: 1989 

 
Predecessors of the New York Central Railroad
Defunct Illinois railroads
Defunct Indiana railroads
Defunct Michigan railroads
West Michigan
Defunct New York (state) railroads
Defunct Ohio railroads
Defunct Pennsylvania railroads
Railroads in the Chicago metropolitan area
Former Class I railroads in the United States
Railway companies established in 1869
Railway companies disestablished in 1914
Former components in the Dow Jones Transportation Average
6 ft gauge railways in the United States
1833 establishments in New York (state)
Railroads controlled by the Vanderbilt family
American companies established in 1833